Nikolay Bortsov (born May 8, 1945 in Lebedyan, Ryazan Oblast) is a Russian political figure, deputy of the 4th, 5th, 6th, 7th, and 8th State Dumas convocations. He was raised by his mother and grandmother as his father died at the front. After the 8th grade of secondary school, he started working as a loader at a pasta factory, simultaneously studying at an evening school. After serving in the army, he got a job as a mechanic at a winery in Lebedyan. In 1981, he was appointed Director of the Cannery Lebedyansky. In 1992, together with his son Yuri, they acquired a controlling interest in Lebedyansky. By 2003, the factory ranked third in Russia in juice production. In 2008, Lebedyansky was sold to PepsiCo and The Pepsi Bottling Group.  

In 2004 together with his son, they founded a charitable foundation that shares their second name. The fond specializes in the restoration of the Russian Orthodox Church temples, also assists war veterans and allocates funds to support science and education.  

Since 2003, Nikolay Bortsov has been a deputy of the State Duma, running with the United Russia.  Since September 2021, he has served as a deputy of the 8th State Duma. 

In 2021, Forbes included Bortsov in the list of the two hundred wealthiest businessmen in Russia.

Awards  
 Order of Honour (2003)
 Order of Friendship (2020)
 Order of Lenin
 Order of the Badge of Honour

References

1945 births
Living people
United Russia politicians
21st-century Russian politicians
Eighth convocation members of the State Duma (Russian Federation)